Qualifying for the 2019 Rugby World Cup for Oceania Rugby began in June 2016, where across 2 years, 3 teams competed for two direct qualification spots from Oceania. Two places were available to Oceania in a cross-regional play-off series' to qualify for the World Cup and or advance through the Repechage.

Two teams from the Oceania region, New Zealand and Australia, qualified automatically for the 2019 World Cup by finishing in the top 12 in the 2015 World Cup. Fiji and Tonga qualified by finishing first and second (on aggregate) in the 2016 and 2017 Pacific Nations Cup competitions. Samoa advanced to the cross regional play-off where they would play a team from Europe for a place in the World Cup; the loser would move to the Repechage. Tahiti won the 2017 Oceania Rugby Cup to advance to the second cross regional play-off, but were disqualified in March 2018 after a World Rugby investigation found they had fielded two ineligible players in their match against the Cook Islands. The Cook Islands were then declared winner of the Oceania Rugby Cup and will advance to the regional playoff to play a team from Asia for a place in the Repechage.

Format
In addition to the two automatically qualified teams (Australia and New Zealand), Oceania had been allocated two further direct berths in the tournament. A third and fourth team from Oceania could join the tournament through cross-regional play-offs and the repechage.

The first round saw the leading three Pacific Nations; Fiji, Samoa and Tonga compete for the two direct qualification spots as Oceania 1 and 2. The three teams played each other home and away across two years, using the revamped World Rugby Pacific Nations Cup in 2016 and 2017 as the regional tournament. The top two teams gained qualification for Rugby World Cup 2019 as Oceania 1 and Oceania 2.

The third-placed team then advanced to a home and away Cross-Regional play-off series against the winners of round 6 in the European regional qualifiers, Europe 2.

Round 2, saw the lower ranked teams in the Pacific region compete for the 2017 Oceania Rugby Cup title, where the winner progressed to a home and away Cross-Regional play-off series against the winner of round 3 in the Asian regional qualifiers, Asia 1. The winner of that series will qualify for a position in the Repechage tournament.

Entrants
Five teams competed during for the 2019 Rugby World Cup – Oceania qualification; teams world rankings are prior to the first European qualification match on 11 June 2016 and bold nations denotes teams have previously played in a Rugby World Cup.

Round 1: Pacific Nations cup 2016–2017

Round 2: 2017 Oceania Rugby Cup
The Cook Islands, as winners, advance to the Asia/Oceania play-off for repechage.

Despite Tahiti winning the match on 5 August 2017, the result was overturned on 23 March 2018, and Tahiti were ejected from qualifying after being found to have breached player eligibility regulations in the Oceania Cup clash. Cook Islands therefore progressed.

References

External links
  "Regional qualification process set for Rugby World Cup 2019" (World Rugby)

2019
2019 Rugby World Cup qualification
World Cup
World Cup